Nicole Khirin (born 16 January 2001) is an Israeli tennis player.

She has a career-high WTA singles ranking of world No. 419, achieved on 1 August 2022.

Khirin represents Israel at the Billie Jean King Cup, where she has a win–loss record of 1–0.

ITF Circuit finals

Singles: 1 runner–up

Doubles: 4 (3 title, 1 runner–up)

Notes

References

External links
 
 
 

2001 births
Living people
Israeli female tennis players
21st-century Israeli women